Several Canadian naval units have been named HMCS Shawinigan.

  (I), a Flower-class corvette that served in the Royal Canadian Navy and was lost during the Battle of the Atlantic.

Battle honours
Atlantic, 1942–44.
Gulf of St. Lawrence, 1942, 1944.

References

Directorate of History and Heritage – HMCS Shawinigan 

Royal Canadian Navy ship names